Poweshiek County is a county in the southeastern part of the U.S. state of Iowa. As of the 2020 census, the population was 18,662. The county seat is Montezuma. The county is named for the chief of the Fox tribe who signed the treaty ending the Black Hawk War. It lies along Interstate 80 between Des Moines and Iowa City. Poweshiek County's largest city is Grinnell.

History
Poweshiek County was formed in 1843. It was named for Meskwaki Chief Poweshiek (1791–1854), a chief of the Fox Indian people. The Poweshiek County Courthouse, completed in 1859, is listed on the National Register of Historic Places.

Government and infrastructure
County business is overseen by three elected county supervisors. The county website provides names and contact information for the current supervisors.

Poweshiek County Elected Officials
County Supervisors: Diana Dawley (D), Jason Roudabush (D), Jeff Tindle (R)
County Attorney: Bart Klaver (R)
County Auditor: Melissa Eilander (R)
County Recorder: Dianna Longhenry (R)
County Sheriff: Tom Kriegel (D) 
County Treasurer: Sandy Ross (R)

Healthcare
Poweshiek County is served by Grinnell Regional Medical Center, an acute care hospital licensed for 81 beds. GRMC was established in 1967 after the merger of two hospitals.

Geography
It is drained by the north fork of Skunk River, which crosses the southwest corner, and by English River and other streams.

Major highways
 Interstate 80
 U.S. Highway 6
 U.S. Highway 63
 Iowa Highway 21
 Iowa Highway 85
 Iowa Highway 146

Transit
 List of intercity bus stops in Iowa

Adjacent counties
Tama County  (north)
Iowa County  (east)
Keokuk County  (southeast)
Mahaska County  (south)
Jasper County  (west)

Demographics

2020 census
There were 8,906 housing units, of which 7,536 were occupied.

2010 census
There were 8,949 housing units, of which 7,555 were occupied.

2000 census

As of the census of 2000, there were 18,815 people, 7,398 households, and 4,882 families in the county. The population density was 32 people per square mile (12/km2). There were 8,556 housing units at an average density of 15 per square mile (6/km2). The racial makeup of the county was 96.74% White, 0.55% Black or African American, 0.23% Native American, 1.07% Asian, 0.05% Pacific Islander, 0.49% from other races, and 0.87% from two or more races. 1.20% of the population were Hispanic or Latino of any race.

Of the 7,398 households 29.0% had children under the age of 18 living with them, 55.8% were married couples living together, 7.4% had a female householder with no husband present, and 34.0% were non-families. 29.2% of households were one person and 13.9% were one person aged 65 or older. The average household size was 2.35 and the average family size was 2.88.

The age distribution was 22.7% under the age of 18, 12.8% from 18 to 24, 24.4% from 25 to 44, 22.5% from 45 to 64, and 17.6% 65 or older.  The median age was 38 years. For every 100 females there were 92.5 males. For every 100 females age 18 and over, there were 88.8 males.

The median household income was $37,836 and the median family income  was $46,599. Males had a median income of $32,781 versus $22,465 for females. The per capita income for the county was $18,629. About 6.2% of families and 9.8% of the population were below the poverty line, including 12.0% of those under age 18 and 5.9% of those age 65 or over.

Education
Poweshiek County is served by three community school districts:

Poweshiek County is home to Grinnell College, a small liberal arts college founded in 1846.

There is one private school in the county, Central Iowa Christian School, in Grinnell.

Communities

Cities

Barnes City
Brooklyn
Deep River
Grinnell
Guernsey
Hartwick
Malcom
Montezuma
Searsboro
Victor

Unincorporated communities
Ewart

Population

Political Townships

 Bear Creek
 Chester
 Deep River
 Grant
 Jackson
 Jefferson
 Lincoln
 Madison
 Malcom
 Pleasant
 Scott
 Sheridan
 Sugar Creek
 Union
 Warren
 Washington

Census-designated places
Holiday Lake

Population ranking
The population ranking of the following table is based on the 2020 census of Poweshiek County.

† county seat

See also

Poweshiek County Courthouse
National Register of Historic Places listings in Poweshiek County, Iowa

References

External links

Poweshiek County Official County website

 
Iowa placenames of Native American origin
1843 establishments in Iowa Territory
Populated places established in 1843